The Dragon's Net is a 1920 action film serial directed by Henry MacRae. It was adapted from J. Allan Dunn's "The Petals of Lao-Tze," from the December 18, 1917 issue of Adventure. Many scenes were shot in the Far East and Hawaii. The film is considered to be lost.

Cast
 Marie Walcamp as Marie Carlton
 Harland Tucker as Harlan Keeler (credited as Harlan Tucker)
 Otto Lederer as King Carson
 Wadsworth Harris as Doctor Redding

Chapter titles
The Mysterious Murder 
Thrown Overboard
A Watery Grave
Into the Chasm
A Jump for Life
Captured in China
The Unseen Foe
Trailed in Peking
On the Great Wall of China
The Train of Death
The Shanghai Peril
The Unmasking

See also
 List of film serials
 List of film serials by studio
 List of lost films

References

External links

1920 films
1920s action films
1920 lost films
American silent serial films
American black-and-white films
Universal Pictures film serials
Lost American films
Films directed by Henry MacRae
Films shot in Hawaii
American action films
Lost action films
1920s American films